This is a list of electoral division results for the Australian 1969 federal election.

Overall
This section is an excerpt from 1969 Australian federal election § Results

New South Wales

Banks 
This section is an excerpt from Electoral results for the Division of Banks § 1969

Barton 
This section is an excerpt from Electoral results for the Division of Barton § 1969

Bennelong 
This section is an excerpt from Electoral results for the Division of Bennelong § 1969

Berowra 
This section is an excerpt from Electoral results for the Division of Berowra § 1969

Blaxland 
This section is an excerpt from Electoral results for the Division of Blaxland § 1969

Bradfield 
This section is an excerpt from Electoral results for the Division of Bradfield § 1969

Calare 
This section is an excerpt from Electoral results for the Division of Calare § 1969

Chifley 
This section is an excerpt from Electoral results for the Division of Chifley § 1969

Cook 
This section is an excerpt from Electoral results for the Division of Cook § 1969

Cowper 
This section is an excerpt from Electoral results for the Division of Cowper § 1969

Cunningham 
This section is an excerpt from Electoral results for the Division of Cunningham § 1969

Darling 
This section is an excerpt from Electoral results for the Division of Darling § 1969

Eden-Monaro 
This section is an excerpt from Electoral results for the Division of Eden-Monaro § 1969

Evans 
This section is an excerpt from Electoral results for the Division of Evans § 1969

Farrer 
This section is an excerpt from Electoral results for the Division of Farrer § 1969

Grayndler 
This section is an excerpt from Electoral results for the Division of Grayndler § 1969

Gwydir 
This section is an excerpt from Electoral results for the Division of Gwydir § 1969

Hughes 
This section is an excerpt from Electoral results for the Division of Hughes § 1969

Hume 
This section is an excerpt from Electoral results for the Division of Hume § 1969

Hunter 
This section is an excerpt from Electoral results for the Division of Hunter § 1969

Kingsford Smith 
This section is an excerpt from Electoral results for the Division of Kingsford Smith § 1969

Lang 
This section is an excerpt from Electoral results for the Division of Lang § 1969

Lowe 
This section is an excerpt from Electoral results for the Division of Lowe § 1969

Lyne 
This section is an excerpt from Electoral results for the Division of Lyne § 1969

Macarthur 
This section is an excerpt from Electoral results for the Division of Macarthur § 1969

Mackellar 
This section is an excerpt from Electoral results for the Division of Mackellar § 1969

Macquarie 
This section is an excerpt from Electoral results for the Division of Macquarie § 1969

Mitchell 
This section is an excerpt from Electoral results for the Division of Mitchell § 1969

New England 
This section is an excerpt from Electoral results for the Division of New England § 1969

Newcastle 
This section is an excerpt from Electoral results for the Division of Newcastle1969

North Sydney 
This section is an excerpt from Electoral results for the Division of North Sydney § 1969

Parramatta 
This section is an excerpt from Electoral results for the Division of Parramatta § 1969

Paterson 
This section is an excerpt from Electoral results for the Division of Paterson § 1969

Phillip 
This section is an excerpt from Electoral results for the Division of Phillip § 1969

Prospect 
This section is an excerpt from Electoral results for the Division of Prospect § 1969

Reid
This section is an excerpt from Electoral results for the Division of Reid § 1969

Richmond 
This section is an excerpt from Electoral results for the Division of Richmond § 1969

Riverina 
This section is an excerpt from Electoral results for the Division of Riverina § 1969

Robertson 
This section is an excerpt from Electoral results for the Division of Robertson § 1969

Shortland 
This section is an excerpt from Electoral results for the Division of Shortland § 1969

St George 
This section is an excerpt from Electoral results for the Division of St George § 1969

Sydney 
This section is an excerpt from Electoral results for the Division of Sydney § 1969

Warringah 
This section is an excerpt from Electoral results for the Division of Warringah § 1969

Wentworth 
This section is an excerpt from Electoral results for the Division of Wentworth § 1969

Werriwa 
This section is an excerpt from Electoral results for the Division of Werriwa § 1969

Victoria

Balaclava 
This section is an excerpt from Electoral results for the Division of Balaclava § 1969

Ballaarat 
This section is an excerpt from Electoral results for the Division of Ballarat § 1969

Batman 
This section is an excerpt from Electoral results for the Division of Batman § 1969

Bendigo 
This section is an excerpt from Electoral results for the Division of Bendigo § 1969

Bruce 
This section is an excerpt from Electoral results for the Division of Bruce § 1969

Burke 
This section is an excerpt from Electoral results for the Division of Burke (1969–2004) § 1969

Casey 
This section is an excerpt from Electoral results for the Division of Casey § 1969

Chisholm 
This section is an excerpt from Electoral results for the Division of Chisholm § 1969

Corangamite 
This section is an excerpt from Electoral results for the Division of Corangamite § 1969

Corio 
This section is an excerpt from Electoral results for the Division of Corio § 1969

Deakin 
This section is an excerpt from Electoral results for the Division of Deakin § 1969

Diamond Valley 
This section is an excerpt from Electoral results for the Division of Diamond Valley § 1969

Flinders 
This section is an excerpt from Electoral results for the Division of Flinders § 1969

Gellibrand 
This section is an excerpt from Electoral results for the Division of Gellibrand § 1969

Gippsland 
This section is an excerpt from Electoral results for the Division of Gippsland § 1969

Henty 
This section is an excerpt from Electoral results for the Division of Henty § 1969

Higgins 
This section is an excerpt from Electoral results for the Division of Higgins § 1969

Holt 
This section is an excerpt from Electoral results for the Division of Holt § 1969

Hotham 
This section is an excerpt from Electoral results for the Division of Hotham § 1969

Indi 
This section is an excerpt from Electoral results for the Division of Indi § 1969

Isaacs 
This section is an excerpt from Electoral results for the Division of Isaacs § 1969

Kooyong 
This section is an excerpt from Electoral results for the Division of Kooyong § 1969

La Trobe 
This section is an excerpt from Electoral results for the Division of La Trobe § 1969

Lalor 
This section is an excerpt from Electoral results for the Division of Lalor § 1969

Mallee 
This section is an excerpt from Electoral results for the Division of Mallee § 1969

Maribyrnong 
This section is an excerpt from Electoral results for the Division of Maribyrnong § 1969

McMillan 
This section is an excerpt from Electoral results for the Division of McMillan § 1969

Melbourne 
This section is an excerpt from Electoral results for the Division of Melbourne § 1969

Melbourne Ports 
This section is an excerpt from Electoral results for the Division of Melbourne Ports § 1969

Murray 
This section is an excerpt from Electoral results for the Division of Murray § 1969

Scullin 
This section is an excerpt from Electoral results for the Division of Scullin § 1969

Wannon 
This section is an excerpt from Electoral results for the Division of Wannon § 1969

Wills 
This section is an excerpt from Electoral results for the Division of Wills § 1969

Wimmera 
This section is an excerpt from Electoral results for the Division of Wimmera § 1969

Queensland

Bowman 
This section is an excerpt from Electoral results for the Division of Bowman § 1969

Brisbane 
This section is an excerpt from Electoral results for the Division of Brisbane § 1969

Capricornia 
This section is an excerpt from Electoral results for the Division of Capricornia § 1969

Darling Downs 
This section is an excerpt from Electoral results for the Division of Darling Downs § 1969

Dawson 
This section is an excerpt from Electoral results for the Division of Dawson § 1969

Fisher 
This section is an excerpt from Electoral results for the Division of Fisher § 1969

Griffith 
This section is an excerpt from Electoral results for the Division of Griffith § 1969

Herbert 
This section is an excerpt from Electoral results for the Division of Herbert § 1969

Kennedy 
This section is an excerpt from Electoral results for the Division of Kennedy § 1969

Leichhardt 
This section is an excerpt from Electoral results for the Division of Leichhardt § 1969

Lilley 
This section is an excerpt from Electoral results for the Division of Lilley § 1969

Maranoa 
This section is an excerpt from Electoral results for the Division of Maranoa § 1969

McPherson 
This section is an excerpt from Electoral results for the Division of McPherson § 1969

Moreton 
This section is an excerpt from Electoral results for the Division of Moreton § 1969

Oxley 
This section is an excerpt from Electoral results for the Division of Oxley § 1969

Petrie 
This section is an excerpt from Electoral results for the Division of Petrie § 1969

Ryan 
This section is an excerpt from Electoral results for the Division of Ryan § 1969

Wide Bay 
This section is an excerpt from Electoral results for the Division of Wide Bay § 1969

South Australia

Adelaide 
This section is an excerpt from Electoral results for the Division of Adelaide § 1969

Angas 
This section is an excerpt from Electoral results for the Division of Angas (1949–1977) § 1949

Barker 
This section is an excerpt from Electoral results for the Division of Barker § 1969

Bonython 
This section is an excerpt from Electoral results for the Division of Bonython § 1969

Boothby 
This section is an excerpt from Electoral results for the Division of Boothby § 1969

Grey 
This section is an excerpt from Electoral results for the Division of Grey § 1969

Hindmarsh 
This section is an excerpt from Electoral results for the Division of Hindmarsh § 1969

Kingston 
This section is an excerpt from Electoral results for the Division of Kingston § 1969

Port Adelaide 
This section is an excerpt from Electoral results for the Division of Port Adelaide § 1969

Sturt 
This section is an excerpt from Electoral results for the Division of Sturt § 1969

Wakefield 
This section is an excerpt from Electoral results for the Division of Wakefield § 1969

Western Australia

Canning 
This section is an excerpt from Electoral results for the Division of Canning § 1969

Curtin 
This section is an excerpt from Electoral results for the Division of Curtin § 1969

Forrest 
This section is an excerpt from Electoral results for the Division of Forrest § 1969

Fremantle 
This section is an excerpt from Electoral results for the Division of Fremantle § 1969

Kalgoorlie 
This section is an excerpt from Electoral results for the Division of Kalgoorlie § 1969

Moore 
This section is an excerpt from Electoral results for the Division of Moore § 1969

Perth 
This section is an excerpt from Electoral results for the Division of Perth § 1969

Stirling 
This section is an excerpt from Electoral results for the Division of Stirling § 1969

Swan 
This section is an excerpt from Electoral results for the Division of Swan § 1969

Tasmania

Bass 
This section is an excerpt from Electoral results for the Division of Bass § 1969

Braddon 
This section is an excerpt from Electoral results for the Division of Braddon § 1969

Denison 
This section is an excerpt from Electoral results for the Division of Denison § 1969

Franklin 
This section is an excerpt from Electoral results for the Division of Franklin § 1969

Wilmot 
This section is an excerpt from Electoral results for the Division of Wilmot § 1969

Territories

Australian Capital Territory 

This section is an excerpt from Electoral results for the Division of Australian Capital Territory § 1969

Northern Territory 

This section is an excerpt from Electoral results for the Division of Northern Territory § 1969

See also 
 Candidates of the 1969 Australian federal election
 Members of the Australian House of Representatives, 1969–1972

References 

House of Representatives 1969